Deer stalking, or simply stalking, is a British term for the stealthy pursuit of deer on foot with the intention of hunting for meat, for leisure/trophy, or to control their numbers. As part of wildlife management, just as with rabbiting and boar hunting, the aim of deer stalking is to help reduce crop damage and obtain venison. Also, as with other types of hunting, deer stalking has long been considered a pastime sport.

Stalked deer are commonly shot with a high-powered bow (in countries other than the UK; in the UK, it is illegal to hunt any animal with a bow) or a rifle; prior to the invention of the modern centerfire rifle, deer were stalked with the aid of a sighthound, such as the Scottish Deerhound. Stalking sticks are often used to steady the aim of the rifle and to steady the binoculars when scanning the ground.

The term "deer hunting" is used in North America to specifically describe the hunting of deer without using hunting dogs, but in Britain and Ireland, the term generally refers to the pursuit of deer with scent hounds and unarmed pursuers, typically on horseback.

History

"Stalking" is defined as to pursue or approach stealthily, which is often necessary when approaching wild deer or the high seat overseeing the area where the deer are likely to be passing. Scottish deer stalking is often done under the guidance of a professional stalker or a resident expert.

Deer stalking is not the only form of control, or culling, for the six wild species of deer at large in the UK. The six species are Red deer, Roe deer, Fallow deer, Sika deer, Muntjac and Chinese Water Deer, and there have never been more deer at large or more widely distributed in the UK than there are now. The first two species are indigenous; new populations have appeared after deliberate releases and escapes from parks or farms. A result of this is that both Red Deer and Roe Deer are now present in several parts of Wales, a country from which both have been absent as wild animals for several centuries. Fallow deer have been at large in many parts of the UK for at least 1,000 years, added to by more recent escapes, but the other three species have solely originated from ornamental collections and deer farms, principally from Woburn Abbey, escaping through damaged fences or sometimes by deliberate release. A number of deer escaped in southern England following damage to fences by the hurricane of 1987.

Apart from the stalking of Red and Sika Deer on the open hillsides of Scotland and the Lake District, which takes place in daylight, most deer stalking takes place in the first and last two hours of daylight and most people never come into contact with it, although it occurs almost everywhere. The only English county without any wild deer is Middlesex, and in all other English and Scottish counties, as well as most Welsh counties, there are deer populations controlled by deer stalking. Antlers are measured by one of several scoring systems used to compare the relative merits of the heads. In Europe, including the UK, the Conseil International du Chasse (CIC) system is used; in America it is either the Boone & Crockett or Safari Club International (SCI), and in Australia it is the Douglas system.

Purpose

There are no natural predators of deer in Britain. Therefore, to maintain a stable and healthy population of deer, a cull of some of them is required each year. This is not random, however, and a deer stalker will have carried out a population count/census to determine the age and sex profile of those to be culled. So then, during the correct deer season, barren, genetically odd, or very old animals are taken. This selection results in a balanced pyramid profile with a few healthy older animals of each sex at the top and increasing numbers of each sex down to the yearlings at the bottom.

The males with outstanding antlers are sometimes referred to as trophy animals, and as part of the cull, can be shot as part of a purchased sporting package to bring income to help with the management of the deer population as a whole. If population reduction is required, more females will be culled. If a population increase is required, only a select few will be culled.

Deerstalkers have the humane despatch of the deer at the forefront of their mind (right behind safe shooting practice), and there are many scenarios which prevent a shot from being taken, such as no safe backstop, no clear shot, the deer does not stop, there are other deer behind the chosen deer, the deer which is visible is out of season, it is not an appropriate animal to cull, it is a good healthy specimen which would be worth keeping to spawn future generations of healthy deer or it is a trophy animal which could bring in much needed funds. This means that not every stalk results in a killed deer, and so it must be borne in mind that elements of selection can result in a "walk with a rifle" which in itself is rewarding as much can be learned by the stalker in the process.

Injured or sick animals are given priority at any time of year whereby a humane exemption in law allows a person to humanely kill any deer out of season or at night "by any reasonable means", if it is so seriously injured or so seriously diseased that to kill it would be an act of mercy. 

A rifle is used that complies with the minimum requirements of the Deer Act (1991) in England and Wales or the Deer (Scotland) Act 1996 in calibre and ballistic performance. Not only are there differences in the law regarding the calibre and ballistic performance between Scotland and England & Wales (popular calibres are .243, .270, .303, .308, 6.5×55mm, .25-06, and .30-06) there are differences in the deer open seasons too. In recent times, the use of sound moderators has greatly increased as a health and safety measure.

See also

Deer hunting
Deerstalker – hat associated with this pastime, and Sherlock Holmes
Game stalker
Hunting strategy
Muckle Hart of Benmore, a famous stag whose stalking was widely anthologized

References

Further reading

The British Deer Society, Training Manual For Deer Stalkers (2012)
The Deer Initiative, Welcome to the England and Wales Deer Best Practice Guides
Scrope, William, Charles Landseer, & Edwin Henry Landseer, The Art of Deer-stalking..(1839)The art of deer-stalking;
MacRae, Alexander, A Handbook of Deer-stalking (1880)A Handbook of Deer-stalking
Whitehurst, Frederick Feild, On the Grampian Hills: Grouse and Ptarmigan Shooting, Deer Stalking, Salmon and Trout Fishing (1882)
Scrope, William, Days of Deer-stalking in the Scottish Highlands (1883)
Grimble, Augustus, Deer-stalking (1886)Deer-stalking
Brander, M., Deer Stalking in Britain (1986)
Chaplin, Raymond E. BSc., MIBiol.,Deer (1977)

External links
The British Deer Society
The Deer Initiative
Deer Stalking Scotland
The Stalking Directory

Deer hunting
Hunting and shooting in Scotland